is a Japanese football player. He plays for Shimizu S-Pulse.

Career
Seiya Niizeki joined J1 League club Shimizu S-Pulse in 2017.

References

External links

1999 births
Living people
Association football people from Shizuoka Prefecture
Japanese footballers
J1 League players
Shimizu S-Pulse players
Association football midfielders